Israel Benjamin Levner (August 1862 – December 1916) was a Hebrew writer and translator. He is best known for his  literature for children.

Selected bibliography
 
  Translated into English as The Legends of Israel (J. Clarke, 1946).

References

1862 births
1916 deaths
19th-century rabbis from the Russian Empire
19th-century male writers from the Russian Empire
Children's non-fiction writers
Children's writers
Editors from the Russian Empire
English–Hebrew translators
French–Hebrew translators
Hebrew-language writers
Jewish writers from the Russian Empire
Male writers from the Russian Empire
Russian children's writers
Russian magazine editors
Textbook writers